Maria Alilia Bagio (born April 21, 1972), better known as Mosang, is a Filipina actress. Mosang is known for portraying various roles in several films, Ded na si Lolo (2009), T2 (2009), and Segunda Mano (2011). 

Mosang frequently appears as Baby Reyes in the Pepito Manaloto.

Career
Mosang began her career in the Philippines as a supporting actress in some of ABS-CBN's notable series, such as Pangako Sa 'Yo in 2000, with Jericho Rosales and Kristine Hermosa. She has also appeared in several Philippine horror films, romantic dramas, and comedies. Mosang is known for her roles in soap operas as Yaya, the antagonist vendor, and others. 

Mosang is widely recognized for her portrayal as Baby Reyes in the Philippine sitcom Pepito Manaloto.  She appeared in many other shows in GMA Network.

Filmography

Television

Films

References

External links
 

1972 births
Living people
Actresses from Manila

GMA Network personalities
ABS-CBN personalities